Anthony Poola (born 15 November 1961) is an Indian prelate of the Catholic Church who has been Archbishop of Hyderabad since 2021. He was Bishop of Kurnool from 2008 to 2020. Before becoming a bishop, he worked as a priest of the Diocese of Cuddapah.

On 27 August 2022, Pope Francis elevated Poola to  Cardinal at a consistory held in Vatican . He is the first of the Dalit caste and the first of Telugu ethnicity to be named a cardinal.

Biography
Anthony Poola was born on 15 November 1961 in Chindukur, Durvesi Parish, in the Diocese of Kurnool. When poverty forced to leave school after the seventh grade, missionaries took an interest in him and helped him continue his schooling. After attending the Minor Seminary in Nuzvid, he studied at St. Peter's Pontifical Seminary in Bangalore. He was ordained a priest on 20 February 1992 and incardinated in the Diocese of Cuddapah.

He held the following positions: 1992-1993: parish vicar of St. Mary's Cathedral from 1992 to 1993; parish vicar in Amagampalli from 1993 to 1994; pastor in Tekurpet from 1994 to 1995; pastor in Badvel from 1995 to 2000; pastor in Veerapalli from 2000 to 2001. He studied for a master's degree in health pastoral care and took courses in theology at Loyola University Chicago. He also worked at St. Genevieve Church in the Archdiocese of Chicago.

Returning to his home diocese of Cuddapah, he was director of the Christian Foundation for Children and Aging from 2004 to 2008. He was also Diocesan Consultor, Secretary for Education, Deputy Administrator of the Schools of the Diocese and Coordinator of the Sponsorship Program.

On 8 February 2008, Pope Benedict XVI appointed him Bishop of Kurnool.

On 19 November 2020, Pope Francis appointed him Archbishop of Hyderabad. He was installed there on 3 January 2021.

On 27 August 2022, Pope Francis made him a cardinal priest, assigning him the title of Santi Protomartiri a Via Aurelia Antica.

See also
 Cardinals created by Pope Francis

References

Additional sources

External links
 
 

Living people
1961 births
Dalit religious leaders
People from Andhra Pradesh
Christian clergy from Andhra Pradesh
Telugu people
21st-century Roman Catholic archbishops in India
Indian cardinals
Cardinals created by Pope Francis